Olivierus martensii is a species of scorpion in the family Buthidae. Its common names include Chinese scorpion, Manchurian scorpion, Chinese armor-tail scorpion and Chinese golden scorpion. Despite its common name, this scorpion is not only found in Manchuria or China, but also in Mongolia and Korea. The record from Japan is doubtful. Its preferred habitat is warm, dry areas with little vegetation.

Taxonomic history
This species of scorpion was first described as Buthus martensii by German arachnologist Ferdinand Karsch in 1879. Independently, Simon in 1880 described specimens he found in the gardens of the summer palace at Peking (present-day Beijing) as Buthus confucius, which Karsch synonymized as Buthus martensii in 1881. Subsequently, in 1950, it was transferred to Mesobuthus, a new genus established by French arachnologist Max Vachon. In 2019 the genus Olivierus was restored from synonymy of Mesobuthus and the species was transferred to Olivierus.

Venom
The venom of O. martensii is composed of many different toxins. Over the past few decades, dozens of novel proteins in this scorpion's venom have been identified, cloned and investigated for clinical applications. For instance, at least 51 long-chain peptides related to the sodium channel toxins (e.g. Makatoxin-3) and 18 peptides related to the potassium channel toxins have been described, along with two peptides, BmK AS and AS1, that act on ryanodine receptors. Apart from having analgesic properties, BmK AS is also the first long-chain scorpion peptide reported to have antimicrobial activity. Amongst the sodium channel-specific neurotoxins, there are a number of muscle relaxants, such as makatoxin I and bukatoxin, while BmKAEP and BmK IT2 have shown anticonvulsant activity in experimental conditions, inhibiting epileptic seizures induced in rats. BmK AGAP has both analgesic and antitumor properties and recombinant proteins could potentially be used in anticancer treatments. 

O. martensii, especially its tail, has been used in traditional Chinese medicine for many centuries to treat various neuronal problems, such as chronic pain, paralysis, apoplexy and epilepsy.

References

Buthidae
Scorpions of Asia
Arthropods of China
Arthropods of Korea
Arthropods of Mongolia
Chelicerates of Japan
Animals described in 1879
Taxa named by Ferdinand Karsch